The New York Times has been involved in many controversies since its foundation in 1851. It is one of the largest newspapers in the United States and the world, and is considered to have worldwide influence and readership. It has been accused of Antisemitism, bias, and playing a notable role in influencing the Iraq War due to its misleading coverage of Saddam Hussein.

Russian Revolution, 1917–1920
In 1920, Walter Lippmann and Charles Merz investigated the coverage of the Russian Revolution by The New York Times from 1917 to 1920. Their findings, published as a supplement of The New Republic, concluded that The New York Times reporting was neither unbiased nor accurate, adding that the newspaper's news stories were not based on facts but "were determined by the hopes of the men who made up the news organizations." Lippmann and Merz alleged that the newspaper referred to events that had not taken place, atrocities that did not exist, and that it reported no fewer than 91 times that the Bolshevik regime was on the verge of collapse. "The news about Russia is an example of what people wanted to see, not what happened," Lippmann and Merz wrote. "The main censor and the main propagandist was the hope and fear in the minds of reporters and editors."

Anti-Ukrainian bias in the 20th and 21st centuries 

The New York Times was criticized for the work of reporter Walter Duranty, who served as its Moscow bureau chief from 1922 through 1936. Duranty wrote a series of stories in 1931 on the Soviet Union and won a Pulitzer Prize for his work at that time; however, he has been criticized for his denial of widespread famine, most particularly the Holodomor, the Ukraine famine in the 1930s.

In 2003, after the Pulitzer Board began a renewed inquiry, the Times hired Mark von Hagen, professor of Russian history at Columbia University, to review Duranty's work. Von Hagen found Duranty's reports to be unbalanced and uncritical, and that they far too often gave voice to Stalinist propaganda. In comments to the press he stated, "For the sake of The New York Times' honor, they should take the prize away."

Coverage of the Holocaust
The Times has been criticized for its coverage of the Holocaust. According to the 2005 book "Buried by the Times" by Laurel Leff, it buried in the back pages of the paper stories about the genocide of European Jews, and avoided mentions of Jewish victims of persecutions, deportations, and death camps. Between 1939 and 1945, the Times published more than 23,000 front-page stories - a half of which were about World War II - and only 26 were about the Holocaust. In the documentary Reporting on The Times: How the paper of record ignored the Holocaust, past editors of the newspaper stated that there was a conscious decision to bury the paper's Holocaust coverage.

Various motivations have been attributed to the decision to bury and minimize the Holocaust, all of which are linked to the Times' publisher at the time, Arthur Hays Sulzberger, who was Jewish. Some claim that Sulzberger feared the Times would be "viewed as 'a special pleader for the Jews'"—at a time when anti-Semitism was relatively common in the United States—if the Holocaust was given more prominent coverage. Others point to Sulzberger's anti-Zionist views as a stronger motive. A Reform Jew and an enthusiastic supporter of the American Council for Judaism, both of which heavily emphasize anti-Zionism, Sulzberger believed European Jews were partially responsible for their own demise in the Holocaust. Not even a personal visit to a concentration camp was enough to shake this conviction. In a 1946 speech, less than one year after his visit to a concentration camp, Sulzberger stated, “'[i]t is my judgment that thousands dead might now be alive' if 'the Zionists' had put 'less emphasis on statehood.'" In another speech that same year, Sulzberger downplayed the plight of displaced Jews, stating "they were 'but a minor percentage of the total of displaced persons' and therefore should not be receiving so much attention." According to the International Holocaust Remembrance Alliance, "[a]ttempts to blame the Jews for causing their own genocide" and "[g]ross minimization of the number of victims of the Holocaust" are forms of Holocaust denial and distortion.

In September 1996, the Times released a statement admitting to "underplaying the Holocaust while it was taking place" and that "[c]lippings from the paper show that the criticism is valid."

Los Alamos investigation 
In 1999, The New York Times ran a series of stories about alleged theft of classified documents from Los Alamos National Lab in New Mexico. The prime suspect, Taiwan-born U.S. citizen  Wen Ho Lee, had his name leaked to The New York Times by U.S. Energy Department officials. Lee was indicted on 59 counts and jailed in solitary confinement for 278 days until he accepted a plea bargain from the government. The alleged breach of security became a catalyst for the creation of the National Nuclear Security Administration (NNSA). Lee was released after the government's case could not be proven.

President Bill Clinton issued a public apology to Dr. Lee over his treatment. The federal judge in charge of the case, James Aubrey Parker, remarked that "top decision makers in the executive branch ... have embarrassed our entire nation and each of us who is a citizen." Lee filed a lawsuit under the Privacy Act alleging that officials had leaked false and incriminating information to the media before charges had been filed. Lee's lawsuit was settled in 2006, just before the U.S. Supreme Court was set to decide whether to hear the case. The issues were similar to those in the Plame affair criminal investigation, when The New York Times reporter Judith Miller spent two-and-a-half months in jail rather than reveal her government source.

Anthrax attacks
In 2002, The New York Times columnist Nicholas Kristof wrote a series of columns indirectly suggesting that Steven Hatfill, a former U.S. Army germ warfare researcher named as a "person of interest" by the FBI, might be a "likely culprit" in the 2001 anthrax attacks. Hatfill was never charged with any crime. In 2004, Hatfill sued The New York Times and Kristof for libel, claiming defamation and intentional infliction of emotional distress.
After years of proceedings, the case was dismissed in 2007, and the dismissal was upheld on appeal. In 2008, the case was appealed to the U.S. Supreme Court which refused to grant certiorari, effectively leaving the dismissal in place. The basis for the dismissal was that Hatfill was a "public figure" and he had not proved malice on the part of The New York Times.

Plagiarism

Jayson Blair 

In 2003, The New York Times admitted that Jayson Blair, one of its reporters, had committed repeated journalistic fraud over a span of several years. Blair immediately resigned following the incident. Questions of affirmative action in journalism were also raised, since Blair is African American. Jonathan Landman, Blair's editor, said he felt that Blair's being Black played a large part in Blair being promoted in 2001 to a full-time staffer. The paper's top two editors – Howell Raines, the executive editor, and Gerald M. Boyd, the managing editor – resigned their posts following the incident.

Relationship with the intelligence community

Judith Miller

Second Iraq War

Judith Miller wrote a series of prominently displayed articles suggesting Iraqi president Saddam Hussein was sourcing materials that could be used to make nuclear weapons. Chief among these was a front page article reporting Iraq's purchase of aluminum tubes "which American officials believe[d] were intended as components of centrifuges to enrich uranium." According to author Michael Massing, the aluminum tubes – which were mentioned in Secretary of State Colin Powell's speech to the United Nations – became "a key prop in the administration's case for war, and the Times played a critical part in legitimizing it." The reporting on the aluminum tubes, and reliance on anti-Saddam campaigner Ahmed Chalabi as a source, soon became a leading critique of the Times' coverage leading up to the 2003 invasion of Iraq. In 2004, the Times published an editorial admitting that it uncritically propagated the claims of their intelligence sources, and contributed to an overall "pattern of misinformation" related to Iraq's nuclear ambitions.

Valerie Plame affair

In October 2005, Judith Miller was released from prison after 85 days, when she agreed to testify to special prosecutor Patrick Fitzgerald's grand jury after receiving a personal waiver, both on the phone and in writing, of her earlier confidential source agreement with Lewis "Scooter" Libby. No other reporter whose testimony had been sought in the case had received such a direct and particularized release. Her incarceration has helped fuel an effort in Congress to enact a federal shield law, comparable to the state shield laws that protect reporters in 31 of the 50 states. After her second appearance before the grand jury, Miller was released from her contempt of court finding. Miller resigned from the paper on November 9, 2005.

MoveOn.org ad controversy

On September 10, 2007, the Times ran a full-page advertisement for MoveOn.org questioning the integrity of General David Petraeus, the commander of U.S. forces in Iraq, entitled "General Petraeus or General Betray Us?" The Times charged MoveOn.org, a liberal activist group, $65,000 for the advertisement. After the New York Post ran a story suggesting that the Times had a political bias in advertising rates, a spokeswoman for the paper said that it did not "distinguish the advertising rates based on the political content of the ad" and that "The advertising folks did not see the content of the ad before the rate was quoted." The paper said that its advertising rates varied for many reasons, with ad buyers getting discounts for bulk buys or a "standby" rate, in which a buyer purchases an ad with no guarantee of a particular date or specific placement in the paper. MoveOn purchased a "standby" rate ad. A subsequent full-page ad bought by Republican presidential hopeful Rudy Giuliani to rebut MoveOn.org's original ad was purchased at the same standby rate. MoveOn later paid The Times the full rate once the newspaper said that "an advertising sales representative made a mistake" by having "failed to make it clear that for that rate the Times could not guarantee the Monday placement but left MoveOn.org with the understanding that the ad would run then."

The ad was also controversial given that the Times internal advertising manual said that "We do not accept opinion advertisements that are attacks of a personal nature." The Times executive who approved the advertisement to run "said that, while it was 'rough,' he regarded it as a comment on a public official's management of his office and therefore acceptable speech for The Times to print."

Corporate-influence concerns
In their book Manufacturing Consent (1988), Edward S. Herman and Noam Chomsky analyze major U.S. media outlets, with an emphasis on The Times. They believe that a bias exists which is neither liberal nor conservative in nature, but aligned towards the interests of corporations, which own most of these media outlets and also provide the majority of their advertising revenue. The authors explain that this bias functions in all sorts of ways:

"by selection of topics, by distribution of concerns, by emphasis and framing of issues, by filtering of information, by bounding of debate within certain limits. They determine, they select, they shape, they control, they restrict — in order to serve the interests of dominant, elite groups in the society."

Chomsky and Herman also touch on the importance of this perceived bias in The Times:"history is what appears in The New York Times archives; the place where people will go to find out what happened is The New York Times. Therefore it's extremely important if history is going to be shaped in an appropriate way, that certain things appear, certain things not appear, certain questions be asked, other questions be ignored, and that issues be framed in a particular fashion."

Duke University lacrosse case reporting

Sports writer Selena Roberts made assertions that "Something happened March 13." Furthermore, Roberts writes, "Players have been forced to give up their DNA, but to the dismay of investigators, none have come forward to reveal an eyewitness account." Johnson points out that this statement was not true.  The captains' March 28, 2006 statement or examined the defense attorneys' subsequent press conference both described the captains' cooperation with police, occurred before she penned her column.  The Times never ran a correction.  Later Roberts in an interview in the Big Lead said, "I wrote that a crime didn't have to occur for us to inspect the irrefutable evidence of misogyny and race baiting that went on that night."

Daniel Okrent, former Times ombudsman admitted to the bias in the Times coverage of the case. He said, "It was too delicious a story.  It conformed too well to too many preconceived notions of too many in the press:  white over black, rich over poor, athletes over non-athletes, men over women, educated over non-educated.  Wow.  That's a package of sins that really fit the preconceptions of a lot of us."

John McCain-lobbyist article criticism

The February 21, 2008 The New York Times published an article on John McCain's alleged relationship with lobbyist Vicki Iseman and other involvement with special interest groups. The article received widespread criticism among both liberals and conservatives, McCain supporters and non-supporters, as well as talk radio personalities. Robert S. Bennett, whom McCain had hired to represent him in this matter, defended McCain's character. Bennett, who was the special investigator during the Keating Five scandal that The Times revisited in the article, said that he fully investigated McCain back then and suggested to the Senate Ethics Committee to not pursue charges against McCain.

"And if there is one thing I am absolutely confident of, it is John McCain is an honest and honest man. I recommended to the Senate Ethics Committee that he be cut out of the case, that there was no evidence against him, and I think for the New York Times to dig this up just shows that Senator McCain's public statement about this is correct. It's a smear job. I'm sorry. " 

Former staffer to President Bill Clinton and Hillary Clinton campaigner Lanny Davis said the article "had no merit." Stating that he did not support McCain's bid for the White House, Davis, who had himself lobbied for the same cause Iseman lobbied McCain for, said that McCain only wrote a letter to the FCC to ask them to "act soon" and refused to write a letter that supported the sale of the television station the article talked about. Journalistic observers also criticized the article, albeit in a milder language. Tom Rosenstiel, the director of the Project for Excellence in Journalism, suggested that the article does not make clear the nature of McCain's alleged "inappropriate" behavior: "The phrasing is just too vague." The article was later criticized by the White House and by several news organizations including the San Francisco Chronicle editorial board. Commentator Bill O'Reilly raised the question about why the paper had endorsed McCain on January 25, 2008, for the Republican nomination if they had information that alleged an inappropriate relationship. The Boston Globe, owned by the Times, declined to publish the story, choosing instead to run a version of the same story written by the competing Washington Post staff. That version focused almost exclusively on the pervasive presence of lobbyists in McCain's campaign and did not mention the sexual relationship that the Times article hinted at.

In response to the criticism, the Times editor Bill Keller was "surprised by the volume" and "by how lopsided the opinion was against our decision [to publish the article]". The diverse sentiments by the readers were summarized in a separate article by Clark Hoyt, the Times public editor, who concluded: "I think it is wrong to report the suppositions or concerns of anonymous aides about whether the boss is getting into the wrong bed."

In September 2008, McCain senior aide Steve Schmidt charged: "Whatever The New York Times once was, it is today not by any standard a journalistic organization. It is a pro-Obama advocacy organization that every day impugns the McCain campaign, attacks Sen. McCain, attacks Gov. Palin. ... Everything that is read in The New York Times that attacks this campaign should be evaluated by the American people from that perspective."

In December 2008, Iseman filed a lawsuit against The New York Times, alleging that the paper had defamed her by, in her view, falsely implying that she had an illicit romantic relationship with McCain. In February 2009, the suit "was settled without payment and The Times did not retract the article." Unusually, however, The Times agreed to publish a statement from Iseman's lawyers on the Times website.

Alessandra Stanley errors
Alessandra Stanley is a television critic. Complaints were raised regarding the accuracy of her reporting. Her tribute to Walter Cronkite on July 18, 2009, had eight factual errors. Clark Hoyt, the public editor of The New York Times described Stanley as "much admired by editors for the intellectual heft of her coverage of television" but "with a history of errors". The New York Times printed a correction:
An appraisal on Saturday about Walter Cronkite's career included a number of errors. In some copies, it misstated the date that Martin Luther King Jr. was killed and referred incorrectly to Cronkite's coverage of D-Day. King was killed on April 4, 1968, not April 30. Mr. Cronkite covered the D-Day landing from a warplane; he did not storm the beaches. In addition, Neil Armstrong set foot on the moon on July 20, 1969, not July 26. "The CBS Evening News" overtook "The Huntley-Brinkley Report" on NBC in the ratings during the 1967-68 television season, not after Chet Huntley retired in 1970. A communications satellite used to relay correspondents' reports from around the world was Telstar, not Telestar. Howard K. Smith was not one of the CBS correspondents Mr. Cronkite would turn to for reports from the field after he became anchor of "The CBS Evening News" in 1962; he left CBS before Mr. Cronkite was the anchor. Because of an editing error, the appraisal also misstated the name of the news agency for which Mr. Cronkite was Moscow bureau chief after World War II. At that time it was United Press, not United Press International.

An earlier contentious wording was on September 5, 2005, in an article on Hurricane Katrina where she wrote "Fox's Geraldo Rivera did his rivals one better: yesterday, he nudged an Air Force rescue worker out of the way so his camera crew could tape him as he helped lift an older woman in a wheelchair to safety." The Times later acknowledged that no nudge was visible on the broadcast tape.

Anti-Indian sentiment

An article published in 2017 in the Times (titled "In India, fashion has become a nationalist cause") was criticized by Indian Twitter users and some commentators, such as Barkha Dutt, for suggesting that the sari was co-opted by the Hindutva movement. Critics said that the article was inaccurate and Orientalist.

Abu Huzaifa al-Kanadi 
Caliphate, a podcast for The New York Times, has received criticism numerous times after Abu Huzaifa al-Kanadi admitted on the podcast that he "murdered people" while he was fighting for the Islamic State group. Numerous conservatives called for action against him after his statement, including Candice Bergen. She criticized the liberal government after not ordering law enforcement against him. Bergen also called for Public Safety Minister Ralph Goodale to reveal whether the government knows where he is or not, but Goodale stated that it was the "opposition of keeping Canadians safe". Huzaifa also received concerns from television journalist Diana Swain that he may be "lying" to The New York Times or CBC News.

In December 2020 the New York Times admitted that it could not verify the claims made in the podcast. Later, the podcast was withdrawn as a Pulitzer finalist.

Publishing leaked photos from the Manchester bombing
On May 24, 2017, The New York Times caused outrage among the British police and government when it published leaked photos showing the scene of the Manchester Arena bombing. Counter terror police chiefs said the leak undermined their investigation and victims' and witnesses' confidence. The New York Times published photos it says were gathered by UK authorities at the scene of the attack, including the remnants of a backpack, nuts and screws, and a device identified as a "possible detonator". Greater Manchester Police were said to be "furious" and said they would stop sharing information with the United States. President Donald Trump the next day in a NATO summit condemned the media leaks, calling it "deeply troubling" and a "grave threat to our national security". The New York Times defended its decision to publish the photos, saying they were "neither graphic nor disrespectful of victims".

Hiring of Sarah Jeong
In August 2018, the Times hired Sarah Jeong to join its editorial board as lead writer on technology, commencing in September. The hiring sparked a strongly negative reaction in conservative media, which highlighted derogatory tweets about white people that Jeong had posted mostly in 2013 and 2014. Critics characterized her tweets as being racist; Jeong said that the posts were "counter-trolling" in reaction to harassment she had experienced, and that she regretted adopting this tactic. The Times stated that it had reviewed her social media history before hiring her, and that it did not condone the posts.

Antisemitism

Antisemitic cartoon
On April 25, 2019, the Times international print edition published a cartoon, drawn by Portuguese cartoonist António Moreira Antunes, featuring U.S. President Donald Trump and Israeli Prime Minister Benjamin Netanyahu. Trump was shown wearing a kippah and Netanyahu was displayed as Trump's dog wearing a collar with the Star of David. The Israeli edition of the newspaper was published at the end of Passover. After criticism from public and religious figures, the Times affirmed it used antisemitic tropes. On April 28 The Times issued an apology. On May 1, 2019, the Times announced that the editor who published the cartoon, whose name has never been released, would be "disciplined." The Times also announced the cancellation of a contract the paper had with the syndicate that provided the cartoon and that the Times would "update its bias training to include a focus on anti-Semitism."  On June 10, 2019, citing the antisemitic cartoon, the Times announced its international edition was ending the publication of daily political cartoons.

Antisemitic political editor
On August 22, 2019, a politics desk editor at the Times, Tom Wright-Piersanti, was revealed to have posted several antisemitic tweets while working at another outlet before joining the Times. He had posted several anti-Indian tweets as well. His tweets included phrases such as "Crappy Jew Year," and "Jew police." The Times reconsidered his future, but ultimately decided to continue his employment.

"Influential Rabbis" and the Iron Dome 
On September 23, 2021, an article written by reporter Catie Edmondson stated that Representative Alexandria Ocasio-Cortez had tearfully changed her vote from “no” to “present” on a vote to fund the Iron Dome because of the pressure exerted on Ocasio-Cortez by "influential lobbyists and rabbis". The claim was criticized on the grounds that discussion of "influential rabbis" echoed antisemitic tropes, with critics asking which rabbis were known to have influence on Ocasio-Cortez; that Edmondson had attributed motives to Ocasio-Cortez without any factual basis; and that one could support the Iron Dome, a defensive installment that protects civilians, if one had been influenced by lobbyists or rabbis. Representative Ritchie Torres called Edmondson's article an example of "casual antisemitism"; the phrase "influential rabbis" was stealth-edited out of the online version of the story but appeared in print.

Swastika crossword puzzle 
In 2022, the Times was criticized after many readers claimed that its December 18 crossword grid resembled a Nazi swastika. Some were particularly upset that the puzzle was published on the first night of Hanukkah. In a statement, the Times claimed the resemblance was unintentional, stemming from the grid's rotational symmetry. The Times was also criticized in 2017 and 2014 for crossword grids that resembled a swastika, which it both times defended as a coincidence.

Delayed publication of 2005 NSA warrantless surveillance story 
The New York Times learned of the National Security Agency (NSA) warrantless surveillance program as early as autumn 2004, before the 2004 presidential election between George W. Bush and John Kerry. However, the newspaper did not publish reporting on the secret program (obtained by James Risen and Eric Lichtblau) until late December 2005, after more than a year. When it published the article, the newspaper reported that it had delayed publication because the George W. Bush White House had argued that publication "could jeopardize continuing investigations and alert would-be terrorists that they might be under scrutiny." The timing of the New York Times story prompted debate, and the Los Angeles Times noted that "critics on the left wondering why the paper waited so long to publish the story and those on the right wondering why it was published at all." Times executive editor Bill Keller denied that the timing of the reporting was linked to any external event, such as the December 2005 Iraqi parliamentary election, the impending publication of Risen's book State of War: The Secret History of the CIA and the Bush Administration, or the then-ongoing debate on Patriot Act reauthorization. Risen and Lichtblau won the Pulitzer Prize for National Reporting in 2006.

In an interview in 2013, Keller said that the newspaper had decided not to report the piece after being pressured by the Bush administration and being advised not to do so by The New York Times Washington bureau chief Philip Taubman, and that "Three years after 9/11, we, as a country, were still under the influence of that trauma, and we, as a newspaper, were not immune."

In 2014, PBS Frontline interviewed Risen and Lichtblau, who said that the newspaper's plan was initially to not publish the story at all, and that "The editors were furious at me" and "thought I was being insubordinate." Risen wrote his book about the mass surveillance revelations after Times declined the piece's publication, and only released it after Risen told them that he would publish the book. Another reporter told NPR that the newspaper "avoided disaster" by ultimately publishing the story. Also in 2014, Edward Snowden cited the delay in the reporting in choosing not to supply The New York Times with his information about global surveillance programs; Snowden chose to go to the Guardian and The Washington Post instead.

M.I.A. quotes out of context (2009–10) 
In February 2009, a Village Voice music blogger accused the newspaper of using "chintzy, ad-hominem allegations" in an article on British Tamil music artist M.I.A. concerning her activism against the Sinhala-Tamil conflict in Sri Lanka. M.I.A. criticized the paper in January 2010 after a travel piece rated post-conflict Sri Lanka the "#1 place to go in 2010".

In June 2010, The New York Times Magazine published a correction on its cover article of M.I.A., acknowledging that the interview conducted by current W editor and then-Times Magazine contributor Lynn Hirschberg contained a recontextualization of two quotes. In response to the piece, M.I.A. broadcast Hirschberg's phone number and secret audio recordings from the interview via her Twitter and website.

Nail salon series (2015) 
In May 2015, a New York Times exposé by Sarah Maslin Nir on the working conditions of manicurists in New York City and elsewhere and the health hazards to which they are exposed attracted wide attention, resulting in emergency workplace enforcement actions by New York governor Andrew M. Cuomo. In July 2015, the story's claims of widespread illegally low wages were challenged by former New York Times reporter Richard Bernstein, in The New York Review of Books. Bernstein, whose wife owns two nail salons, asserted that such illegally low wages were inconsistent with his personal experience, and were not evidenced by ads in the Chinese-language papers cited by the story. The New York Times editorial staff subsequently answered Bernstein's criticisms with examples of several published ads and stating that his response was industry advocacy. The independent NYT Public Editor also reported that she had previously corresponded with Bernstein and looked into his complaints, and expressed her belief that the story's reporting was sound.

In September and October 2015, nail salon owners and workers protested at The New York Times offices several times, in response to the story and the ensuing New York State crackdown. In October, Reason magazine published a three-part re-reporting of the story by Jim Epstein, charging that the series was filled with misquotes and factual errors respecting both its claims of illegally low wages and health hazards. Epstein additionally argued that The New York Times had mistranslated the ads cited in its answer to Bernstein, and that those ads actually validated Bernstein's argument.

In November 2015, The New York Times public editor concluded that the exposé's "findings, and the language used to express them, should have been dialed back — in some instances substantially" and recommended that "The Times write further follow-up stories, including some that re-examine its original findings and that take on the criticism from salon owners and others — not defensively but with an open mind."

Iran (2015)
A 2015 study claimed that The New York Times fed into an overarching tendency towards national bias. During the Iranian nuclear crisis the newspaper minimized the "negative processes" of the United States while overemphasizing similar processes of Iran. This tendency was shared by other papers such as The Guardian, Tehran Times, and the Fars News Agency, while Xinhua News Agency was found to be more neutral while at the same time mimicking the foreign policy of the People's Republic of China.

2016 Democratic primaries
Responding to complaints alleging that the paper's news coverage favored Hillary Clinton over Bernie Sanders during the 2016 Democratic presidential primaries, The Times public editor Margaret Sullivan wrote that "The Times has not ignored Mr. Sanders's campaign, but it hasn't always taken it very seriously. The tone of some stories is regrettably dismissive, even mocking at times. Some of that is focused on the candidate's age, appearance and style, rather than what he has to say." Times senior editor Carolyn Ryan defended both the volume of The New York Times coverage (noting that Sanders had received about the same amount of article coverage as Jeb Bush and Marco Rubio) and its tone.

Hiring practices
In November 1979, a federal court gave approval to a settlement between The New York Times and a group of female Times employees who sued alleging sex discrimination. The settlement agreement was effective for a four-year period beginning in January 1979; under the agreement, the company amended existing equal opportunity targets and paid $350,000 in compensation and attorneys' fees for the plaintiffs, but was not required to "pay new or retroactive salary increases, make immediate promotions, revoke past employment practices or substantially change its present affirmative-action programs." James C. Goodale, the executive vice president of the New York Times Company, said that the settlement "completely vindicates The Times of any charge or hint of unfair employment practices."

In April 2016, two black female employees in their sixties filed a federal class-action lawsuit against The New York Times Company executives; they claimed age, gender, and racial discrimination, alleging that the 'Times advertising department favored younger white employees over older black employees in making firing and promotion decisions. The Times said that the suit was "entirely without merit" and was "a series of recycled, scurrilous and unjustified attacks." The plaintiffs' gender discrimination claims were subsequently dismissed by the court, and the court also later denied class certification as to the age and racial discrimination claims.

Obituary of President Thomas S. Monson (2018) 
The day after the passing of Thomas S. Monson, president of the Church of Jesus Christ of Latter Day Saints on January 2, 2018, The New York Times posted an obituary covering his life but seemingly highlighting and focusing on the controversies that happened during his presidency. Afterwards, the obituary gained attention and quick criticism from members of the church and non members and news organizations alike which resulted in a petition which quickly gained over 170,000 signatures. The main issue of the obituary was pointed out at how much they wrote and focused on the controversies in Monson's presidency instead of his many accomplishments and charitable work. They've also compared the stark contrast in how people like Fidel Castro and Hugh Hefner's obituaries were written in a more favorable light. The Obituaries Editor William McDonald responded "I think the obituary was a faithful accounting of the more prominent issues that Mr. Monson encountered and dealt with publicly during his tenure. Some of these matters — the role of women in the church, the church's policy toward homosexuality and same-sex marriage, and more — were widely publicized and discussed, and it's our obligation as journalists, whether in an obituary or elsewhere, to fully air these issues from both sides. I think we did that, accurately portraying Mr. Monson's positions as leader of the church, and those of the faithful and others who questioned church policies. I think we also gave due credit to Mr. Monson's achievements: his openness to new work by scholars of the church, "allowing them" as we said, "remarkable access to church records"; his expansion of the church's global missionary force and his doubling the number of young women in the missionary ranks; and his embracing humanitarian causes, often in collaboration with Jewish, Muslim and other Christian groups. But I also acknowledge that many of those who found the obituary wanting feel we did not provide a more rounded view of Mr. Monson — perhaps his more human side. I'll concede that what we portrayed was the public man, not the private one, or the one known to his most ardent admirers. In 20/20 hindsight, we might have paid more attention to the high regard with which he was held within the church. I think by his very position in the church, all that was implied. But perhaps we should have stated it more plainly. Still, on balance, I think the obituary makes clear that he was a man of strong faith and convictions, who stood by them even in the face of detractors, while finding ways to move the church forward."

Elimination of copy editors (2018) 
The New York Times announced plans to eliminate copy editing roles from the production of its daily newspaper and website content in June 2018. Executive Editor Dean Baquet defended the cuts, saying that the Times needed to free up funds to hire more reporters by eliminating editing roles. (The opinion and magazine sections have still retained their copy editors.) The duties of copy editors—checking for style, grammar, factual correctness, tone, as well as writing headlines—were merged into all-purpose editing roles. Editors currently not only edit the content of the stories but also, in many cases, provide the final read before publication.

Many publications, such as the Chronicle of Higher Education, have suggested the elimination of copy editors has led to more mistakes, such as typos and factual errors, in the paper. The Poynter Institute similarly suggested in a blog post that the elimination of copy editors would decrease internal expertise and hurt the quality of the daily news report.

1619 Project
The 1619 Project, a long-form journalism project re-evaluating slavery and its legacy in the United States by investigative journalist Nikole Hannah-Jones, has been criticized by some historians.

In December 2019, a group of historians wrote to The New York Times Magazine, expressing concern over what they alleged were inaccuracies and falsehoods fundamental to Hannah-Jones' reporting. The magazine's editor-in-chief, Jake Silverstein, responded to the historians' letter in an editorial, in which he called into question the historical accuracy of some of the letter's claims. In an article in The Atlantic, historian Sean Wilentz responded to Silverstein, writing, "No effort to educate the public in order to advance social justice can afford to dispense with a respect for basic facts" and disputed the accuracy of Silverstein's defense of the project.

In September 2020, controversy arose over the Times updating the opening text of the project website to remove the phrase "understanding 1619 as our true founding" without accompanying editorial notes. Critics, including Bret Stephens of the Times, claimed the difference showed that the newspaper was backing away from some of the initiative's more controversial claims. The Times defended its practices and Hannah-Jones emphasized how most of the project's content had remained unchanged—but also admitted that she was "absolutely tortured by" her failure to consult more expert historians before making the sweeping claims that were subsequently removed.

Tom Cotton editorial (2020)
During the George Floyd protests in June 2020, the Times published an opinion piece by U.S. Senator Tom Cotton entitled "Send in the Troops", which called for the mobilization of the U.S. military in response to rioting, and for "an overwhelming show of force to disperse, detain and ultimately deter lawbreakers", and which contained claims about the protests that the Times had previously identified as misinformation. Several current and former Times reporters criticized the decision to publish the piece and accused the newspaper of publishing misinformation. The NewsGuild of New York argued that the piece encouraged violence and lacked context and vetting. A. G. Sulzberger and editorial page editor James Bennet defended the piece, but the paper later issued a statement saying the piece failed to meet its editorial standards and described its publication as the result of a "rushed editorial process". Bennet resigned days later. Cotton criticized the Times for retracting his piece, saying that "The New York Times editorial page editor and owner defended it in public statements but then they totally surrendered to a woke child mob from their own newsroom that apparently gets triggered if they're presented with any opinion contrary to their own, as opposed to telling the woke children in their newsroom this is the workplace, not a social justice seminar on campus".

Coverage of The Babylon Bee (2021) 
In June 2021, Seth Dillon, the CEO of conservative Christian news satire website The Babylon Bee, threatened legal action against The New York Times, alleging that they had defamed the site in a March 2021 article by referring to The Babylon Bee as a "far-right misinformation site". The Times first amended the article, then removed the descriptor and published a clarification about the labeling dispute between Snopes and The Babylon Bee.

Michigan State University Shooting (2023) 
Following the mass shooting at Michigan State University, The New York Times published an article by journalist Tiffany May titled, "The mass shooting places Michigan State back in an uncomfortable national spotlight," which centered the USA gymnastics sex abuse scandal and 2017 trial of Larry Nassar. The article has been criticized as "tone-deaf" and "journalistically irresponsible" for pairing the sex abuse scandal with the shooting, with many calling for May to be reprimanded. On February 17, 2023, the Times published "Three Booms. A Masked, Armed Man. How Horror Unfolded in a Michigan State Classroom," which faced criticism from people expecting an apology instead of an article they deemed to be turning "Michigan State's trauma into a screenplay".

Open letters on transgender coverage 

The New York Times’ reporting on transgender issues has in the past often been described by many, including major medical organizations, as “misinformation”, “ignoring evidence”, and “fearmongering”.

In February 2023, almost 1000 current and former Times writers and contributors wrote an open letter addressed to Philip B. Corbet, accusing the paper of  publishing biased articles about transgender, non⁠-⁠binary, and gender nonconforming people, some of which have been referenced heavily in amicus briefs like the defense of Alabama’s Vulnerable Child Compassion and Protection Act. Contributors wrote that, “the Times has in recent years treated gender diversity with an eerily familiar mix of pseudoscience and euphemistic, charged language, while publishing reporting on trans children that omits relevant information about its sources.” One example referenced was an article that inaccurately used the term “patient zero,” to a trans child seeking gender⁠-⁠affirming care. Hundreds of high profile figures signed the letter such as Roxane Gay, Jenna Wortham, Dave Itzkoff, Ed Yong, Chelsea Manning, Sarah Schulman, Jia Tolentino, Lena Dunham, Kate Zambreno, Gabrielle Union, Judd Apatow, Tommy Dorfman, and Cynthia Nixon.

A second letter was released the same day as reported by NPR. This letter included over 100 LGBTQ and civil rights groups, including GLAAD, the Human Rights Campaign and PFLAG, stating support for the letter from contributors and that the Times is platforming “fringe theories” and “dangerous inaccuracies." Both letters used fact checkers to check sources for articles and op-eds and referenced to the Times history of homophobia from 1963 to 1987 as evidence of previous bias regarding populations of people. Support for this claim was a ban made by Arthur Ochs Sulzberger on using the word "gay" by anyone writing or editing at the newspaper.

Within a day the NYT issued a response, saying “Our journalism strives to explore, interrogate and reflect the experiences, ideas and debates in society – to help readers understand them. Our reporting did exactly that and we’re proud of it”. The next day, the NYT published an op-ed piece entitled “In defense of JK Rowling”.

That same day, an internal memo was sent by the editors, saying “Our coverage of transgender issues, including the specific pieces singled out for attack, is important, deeply reported, and sensitively written. We do not welcome, and will not tolerate, participation by Times journalists in protests organized by advocacy groups or attacks on colleagues on social media and other public forums.”

See also
 Al Jazeera controversies and criticism
 CBS News controversies and criticism
 CNN controversies
 Fox News controversies
 MSNBC controversies
 Media bias
 Media bias in the United States

References

External links
 The New York Times on the Web
 Official history of the Times
 Sullum, Jacob (2010-04-28) Free Speech for Us: The Gray Lady's inconsistent defense of the First Amendment, Reason

The New York Times
New York Times